Della Penna is an Italian language and Spanish language surname. Notable people with the surname include:

Claudio Della Penna (born 1989), Italian footballer
Dolores Della Penna (died 1972), American murder victim
Francesco della Penna (1680–1745), Capuchin missionary

See also
Penna (surname)

Italian-language surnames
Spanish-language surnames